Bad Love is the ninth studio album by American singer-songwriter Randy Newman, released on June 1, 1999. It was Newman's first solo album since 1988's Land of Dreams and followed an 11-year hiatus during which Newman had focused on film soundtracks, receiving several Academy Award nominations.

Background 
The album finds Newman bitter and satirical – as "biting as ever, yet unafraid to tackle personal and heartfelt concerns". Newman tackles issues such as the state of American culture in "My Country", which chronicles suburbia's growing dependence on television, and "The World Isn’t Fair", which takes a look at the world through the eyes of Karl Marx. Another subject is aging – "Shame" takes a negative look at an "older man courting a younger woman" via the barbed lyrics and an exchange between the lead vocalist and the backing singer. "I’m Dead (But I Don't Know It)" is more self-referential in dealing with aging rock stars and commenting: "Everything I write sounds the same / Each record that I’m making / Is like a record that I’ve made / Just not as good".

"Every Time It Rains"  was composed for Michael Jackson but he declined to record it, while "I Miss You" was composed for Newman's ex-wife.

Newman later said, "Before I started Bad Love, I wasn't exactly sure I could do a rock 'n' roll record at 65, or however old I was. But I was satisfied that it was a good record. Maybe my best record."

This album was Newman's only release for DreamWorks Records.

Critical reception 

It received generally positive reviews from critics, placing 11th in the 1999 Pazz & Jop Critics Poll.

AllMusic stated that the songs on Bad Love "should rest comfortably alongside his other four-star offerings."

Track listing 
All songs written by Randy Newman.

Personnel

Notes 

Randy Newman albums
1999 albums
Albums produced by Mitchell Froom
Albums produced by Tchad Blake
DreamWorks Records albums
Albums arranged by Randy Newman
Albums conducted by Randy Newman
Albums recorded at Capitol Studios
Albums recorded at Sunset Sound Recorders